Luis Marileo Colipí was a Mapuche chief active in the Mapuche resistance to the Occupation of Araucanía (1861–1883). Luis Marileo Colipí allegedly attacked Lumaco during the Mapuche uprising of 1881. Because of this he was stripped of the more than 6,000 ha land he owned near Purén. His brother who had also participated in the uprising was taken prisoner and killed. After the uprising Luis Marileo Colipí fled to Argentina.

References

Bibliography 

19th-century Mapuche people
People of the Occupation of Araucanía
Indigenous leaders of the Americas
People from Araucanía Region
Year of birth missing
Revolutionaries
Lonkos